The 2008 Copenhagen Masters in badminton was the 16th edition of the Copenhagen Masters. It was held in Copenhagen, from December 27 to December 29, 2008.

Only three categories were played: men's singles, women's singles and men's doubles.

Men's singles

Group 1

Group 2

Finals

Women's singles

Group 1

Group 2

Finals

Men's doubles

Group 1

Group 2

Finals

External links
Tournamentsoftware: Draws & results

Copenhagen Masters
Copenhagen Masters
Copenhagen Masters